Multiplexin is a family of collagens.

References

Collagens